The Sturgeon River Provincial Park is a provincial park in northern Ontario, Canada, that protects about  long section of the Sturgeon River and its banks, from Woods Lake (at the boundary of Lady Evelyn-Smoothwater Park in Timiskaming District) to the Sudbury-Nipissing District boundary. It was established in 1989 and expanded in 2005. It protects outstanding water routes that provide recreational canoe camping opportunities. Other activities include hunting and fishing.

The park is one of the several provincial parks in the Temagami area. It forms a natural corridor with the adjacent Lady Evelyn-Smoothwater Provincial Park, Solace Provincial Park, Chiniguchi Waterway Provincial Park, and Obabika River Provincial Park. All parks are managed by Ontario Parks.

Features 
The river features a continually changing landscape, from the Temagami highlands, with bedrock outcrops and long slender lakes to narrow river channels, rapids and shallows, eventually turning to sandy shores.

This river is only suitable for experienced backcountry canoeists. With some 65 rapids, canoeists should be able to portage and/or have whitewater canoeing skills. Detailed maps for navigation are essential. Despite its remote setting, it is an operating park, requiring permits for camping (not for day use). The only facilities are 35 backcountry campsites.

References

External links

Friends of Temagami

Provincial parks of Ontario
Parks in Sudbury District
1989 establishments in Ontario